Lauren "Lolo" Silver (born January 28, 1987) is an American water polo player.

College career
Silver attended Stanford University, playing on the women's water polo team from
2006 to 2009. As a freshman she was named Mountain Pacific Sports Federation Newcomer of the Year.

International career

Silver made her senior debut with the United States women's national water polo team in 2009 winning a gold medal at 2009 FINA World League in Kirishi, Russia.

References

1987 births
Living people
American female water polo players
Sportspeople from Long Beach, California
21st-century American women
Stanford Cardinal women's water polo players